Signal peptidase II (premurein-leader peptidase, prolipoprotein signal peptidase, leader peptidase II, premurein leader proteinase) is an enzyme.

This enzyme catalyses a chemical reaction. It releases signal peptides from murein prolipoprotein and other bacterial membrane prolipoproteins. It also hydrolyses -Xaa-Yaa-Zaa-(S,diacylglyceryl)Cys-, in which Yaa (Ala or Ser) and Zaa (Gly or Ala) have small neutral sidechains, and Xaa is hydrophobic (preferably Leu).

This enzyme is present in bacterial inner membranes.

References

External links 
 

EC 3.4.23